Strikeforce: Destruction was a mixed martial arts event held on November 21, 2008.  The event was held by Strikeforce and took place at the HP Pavilion at San Jose in San Jose, California. This event aired live and free on HDNet.

Results

See also 
 Strikeforce (mixed martial arts)
 List of Strikeforce champions
 List of Strikeforce events
 2008 in Strikeforce

References

Destruction
2008 in mixed martial arts
Mixed martial arts in San Jose, California
2008 in sports in California